David Abell or Abel Ebel (died c. 1576) was a Danish-German composer and organist. He worked in the Kantoriet (the choir and orchestra of the Danish king) of Christian III.

From 1555 to 1572 he was employed by the Marienkirche in Lübeck, after which he returned to Copenhagen on Frederick II's insistence. In the Kantoriet's records from 1541, there are four choral works by him.

External links
Article at the Odense Museum

Danish classical composers
German male classical composers
Danish classical organists
German classical composers
German classical organists
German male organists
Renaissance composers
Year of birth missing
1570s deaths
Year of death uncertain
Male classical organists